Hervé Pierre (born 22 April 1955) is a French actor and theatre director. He joined the Comédie-Française in 2007 and became a member in 2011.

On 14 June 2009, Pierre was awarded the title of Best French Actor by critics. In 2011, he was promoted chevalier de l'ordre des Arts et des Lettres and in 2011, Knight of the French Legion of Honour.

Theatre career
Hervé Pierre began to play in theatre troupes first in Les Fins, where he was born, then in the Pontarlier lycee. He followed, from 1974 to 1977, the teachings of Claude Petitpierre, Jean-Pierre Vincent, Jean Dautremay, and Jean-Louis Hourdin at the National Theatre of Strasbourg.

In 1977, he formed the Théâtre du Troc with his TNS promotion company, leading it until 1981.

Personal life
Pierre is married to French actress Clotilde Mollet.

Selected list of performances

References

External links
 

1955 births
Living people
French male film actors
Recipients of the Legion of Honour